The Arrondissement of Kortrijk is one of the eight administrative arrondissements in the Province of West Flanders, Belgium.

It is both an administrative and a judicial arrondissement. However, the Judicial Arrondissement of Kortrijk also comprises most municipalities in the Arrondissement of Roeselare (except Staden, Moorslede and Lichtervelde), as well as the southernmost municipalities of the Arrondissement of Tielt: Meulebeke, Dentergem, Oostrozebeke en Wielsbeke.

History
The Arrondissement of Kortrijk was created in 1800 as the fourth arrondissement in the Department of Lys. It originally comprised the cantons of Avelgem, Harelbeke, Ingelmunster, Kortrijk, Menen, Meulebeke, Moorsele, Oostrozebeke and Roeselare.

In 1818, the canton of Avelgem was ceded to the new Arrondissement of Avelgem, the canton of Menen to the new Arrondissement of Menen, the canton of Roeselare to the new Arrondissement of Roeselare, the canton of Meulebeke to the new Arrondissement of Tielt and the cantons of Ingelmunster and Oostrozebeke to the new Arrondissement of Wakken. The arrondissements of Avelgem and Menen already ceased to exist in 1823 and were returned to the Arrondissement of Kortrijk.

When the language border was determined in 1963, Mouscron and the then municipalities of Luingne, Herseaux and Dottignies, as well as the neighbourhood of Risquons-Tout, which was located in the then municipality of Rekkem, were ceded to the newly formed Arrondissement of Mouscron.

Municipalities
The Administrative Arrondissement of Kortrijk consists of the following municipalities:

Anzegem
Avelgem
Deerlijk
Harelbeke

Kortrijk
Kuurne
Lendelede
Menen

Spiere-Helkijn
Waregem
Wevelgem
Zwevegem

See also
 List of Dutch exonyms for places in Belgium

References

Kortrijk